Halle (Westf) is a railway station located in Halle, North Rhine-Westphalia, Germany. The station is on the Osnabrück–Brackwede railway. The train services are operated by NordWestBahn.

Train services 
The following services currently call at Halle:

References

Railway stations in North Rhine-Westphalia
Halle (Westfalen)
Buildings and structures in Gütersloh (district)
Railway stations in Germany opened in 1886